Luis Oscar Boettner (unknown – unknown), was a Paraguayan chess player, two times Paraguayan Chess Championship winner (1946, 1947).

Biography
From the late 1930s to the end 1940s, Luis Oscar Boettner was one of Paraguay's leading chess players. He twice in row won Paraguayan Chess Championships in 1946 and 1947.

Luis Oscar Boettner played for Paraguay in the Chess Olympiad:
 In 1939, at fourth board in the 8th Chess Olympiad in Buenos Aires (+3, =5, -8).

References

External links

Luis Oscar Boettner chess games at 365chess.com

Year of birth missing
Year of death missing
Paraguayan chess players
Chess Olympiad competitors
20th-century chess players
20th-century Paraguayan people